Merah Putih is an Indonesian term for "red (and) white", it may refer to:
 Flag of Indonesia, known in native Indonesian as Sang Saka Merah-Putih, Bendera Merah-Putih or Merah-Putih
 Merah Putih Bridge, a bridge spanned over Ambon Bay in Ambon City, Ambon Island, Maluku Province, Indonesia
 Merah Putih (film), a 2009 war film depicting Indonesian struggle for independence
 Merah Putih (satellite), an Indonesian satellite

See also
 Red and White (disambiguation)